Here I Am  is the second studio album by German singer Alexander Klaws. It was released by Sony BMG on Hansa Records on 12 July 2004 in German-speaking Europe.

Track listing

Charts

References

2004 albums
Alexander Klaws albums
Sony BMG albums
Hansa Records albums